Brachyodina is a genus of flies in the family Stratiomyidae.

Species
Brachyodina caymanensis Woodley, 2014
Brachyodina depressa (James, 1967)
Brachyodina dorsata (Johnson, 1920)
Brachyodina insularis (James, 1966)
Brachyodina janestanleyae Woodley, 2014
Brachyodina metzi (Johnson, 1919)
Brachyodina niveioscula Lindner, 1949
Brachyodina tomentosa (James, 1974)

References

Stratiomyidae
Brachycera genera
Taxa named by Erwin Lindner
Diptera of North America
Diptera of South America